The 2003–04 Lega Basket Serie A, known as the Serie A TIM for sponsorship reasons, was the 82nd season of the Lega Basket Serie A, the highest professional basketball league in Italy.

The regular season ran from October 4, 2003 to May 9, 2004, 18 teams played 34 games each. The top 8 teams made the play-offs whilst the two lowest ranked teams, Coop Nordest Trieste and Sicilia Messina, were relegated to the Legadue.

Montepaschi Siena won their first ever title by winning the playoff finals series against Skipper Bologna.

Teams

Season narrative

Preseason
The league signed a three-year sponsorship contract with mobile phone company TIM in September 2003, award the naming rights for the competition.

Prior to the start of  play, in August 2003, Virtus Bologna were excluded from the league due to financial irregularities (namely unpaid wages), they were replaced by Sicilia Messina, the losing finalist of the preceding year's Legadue, a proposal to expand the league to 20 clubs and thus include both clubs was not approved.
 
Reigning champions Benetton Treviso were seen as the favourites to retain their title, teams Lottomatica Roma, Scavolini Pesaro, Montepaschi Siena and Skipper Bologna were seen as the main challengers, with Air Avellino, Coop Nordest Trieste, Mabo Livorno and above all Sicilia Messina seen as the clubs fighting to avoid relegation.

Regular season

Montepaschi Sienna finished first in the league for the first time of their history, Skipper Bologna and Benetton Treviso finished equal on points in second place but Skipper was 2-0 in their direct confrontations and hence superseded Treviso. The title was strongly expected to be disputed between these three teams.

At the other end of the standings, late promotee Sicilia Messina predictably struggled on the court - a relegation confirmed in the penultimate round seen as an achievement - and off the court, with financial problems and a perceived disinterest by the public.  
The other relegated team Coop Nordest Trieste also struggled financially (along with some other Serie A teams), both would declare bankruptcy in the course of the following year.

Playoffs

After reaching the finals for a historic first time, Montepaschi Sienna won its first championship after winning all of its playoff games. 
Losing finalist Skipper Bologna's prior defeat of Benetton Treviso meant that Benetton, who had won the last two editions, did not compete in the final for only the second time in six years.

Regular season

Individual statistics, regular season

Points

Assists

Rebounds

Steals

Blocks

Valuation

Play-offs

Montepaschi Siena vs. Metis Varese

Scavolini Pesaro vs. Pompea Napoli

Benetton Treviso vs. Oregon Scientific Cantù

Skipper Bologna vs. Lottomatica Roma

Semifinals

Montepaschi Siena vs. Scavolini Pesaro

Skipper Bologna vs. Benetton Treviso

Finals

Montepaschi Siena vs. Skipper Bologna

Supercup
The Italian Basketball Supercup opened the season on September 27, 2003 in the PalaVerde in Treviso, it pitted reigning champions and 2002-03 cup holders Benetton Treviso against Oregon Scientific Cantù, finalists in the previous year's cup. 
Cantù upset Benetton 85-79 to win its first trophy in 12 years, with Nate Johnson named MVP  for his first game in Italy.

All Star Game
The All Star Game was played in Genoa on December 13, 2004 in the newly opened PalaFiumara. The foreign All Stars beat Italy, bronze medalists at EuroBasket 2003, 106-99 after coming back from behind 55-26 down to force an overtime. Maurice Evans was designated MVP whilst Michele Mian won the three point shootout.

Cup
The Cup was contested between 25 February and 28 February in the PalaFiera in Forlì between the 8 best ranked teams of the first phase of the league. Benetton Treviso won the cup for the second successive season, beating Scavolini Pesaro 85-76, Jorge Garbajosa was named as the Final Eight MVP.

Awards
Most Valuable Player:
 Gianluca Basile (Skipper Bologna)
Coach of the year:
 Carlo Recalcati (Montepaschi Siena)
Finals MVP:
 David Andersen (Montepaschi Siena)

Notes

References

External links
"Calendar of the 2003-04 season at." , Lega Basket. Retrieved on 6 June 2015. 

Lega Basket Serie A seasons
1
Italy